The Ferdinand Lafrentz House, at 2015 Warren Ave. in Cheyenne, Wyoming, was built in 1882.  It was listed on the National Register of Historic Places in 1979.

It has elements of Queen Anne style and was deemed "representative of the type of frame cottage that was built in Cheyenne during the last quarter of the nineteenth century."

It is significant in part for its association with three persons of importance:
Lloyd Fredendall, whose father owned the house, and who became Lieutenant-General in the U.S. Army, notably serving in North Africa in 1942 and becoming a commander of the Second Army in 1943
Ferdinand W. Lafrentz, who owned the house during the 1884-87
Robert N. LaFontaine, a Cheyenne contractor.

References

National Register of Historic Places in Laramie County, Wyoming
Queen Anne architecture in Wyoming
Houses completed in 1882